Michael Eggert may refer to:

 Michael Eggert (businessman) (born 1975), businessman from Copenhagen, Denmark
 Michael Eggert (footballer) (born 1952), retired German footballer